The First Pitch is a 2012 bronze statue of James D. Griffin, by William Koch.
It is located at Swan Street and Washington Street, outside Sahlen Field in Buffalo.

Griffin, the former Mayor of Buffalo, was instrumental in getting Sahlen Field built and bringing the Buffalo Bisons franchise to the city while he was in office. Following his death in 2008, Griffin was posthumously honored by the Buffalo Common Council after they voted to change Sahlen Field's address to One James D. Griffin Plaza.

The work depicts Griffin throwing the ceremonial first pitch at Sahlen Field's inaugural game on April 14, 1988.

References

External links
Buffalo Architecture and History – The First Pitch

2012 sculptures
Baseball culture
Buffalo Bisons (minor league)
Buildings and structures in Buffalo, New York
Monuments and memorials in New York (state)
Outdoor sculptures in New York (state)
Sculptures of men in New York (state)
Sculptures of sports
Statues in New York (state)